Mary Ann Swenson is an American bishop of the United Methodist Church, elected in 1992.

Birth and family
Mary Ann Swenson (née McDonald) was born 8 July 1947 in Pine Bluff, Arkansas.  She was raised and educated in Jackson, Mississippi, where she was active in Sunday School, church youth group and choir at the Capitol Street Methodist Church.  She married Jeffrey Joe Swenson of Elma, Washington 31 August 1968.  Growing up on a dairy farm, Jeff is a graduate of the University of Puget Sound, Tacoma, Washington with a B.A. degree in fine arts.  He also served in the U.S. Navy in Vietnam.  The Swenson family also includes their dog, Bubba.

Education
Mary Ann graduated from Millsaps College in Jackson, Mississippi in 1969 with a B.A. degree in Religion.  She earned a D.Min. degree from the School of Theology at Claremont in 1975.  Her thesis was "A Synthesis Between Personal Piety and the Social Gospel in the Modern Church."

Ordained ministry
Swenson served as the Youth Director for the St. Luke and Capitol Street United Methodist churches in Jackson, Mississippi, 1966–69. She was the Director of Youth Ministry at the Mason U.M. Church in Tacoma, Washington and the Elma U.M. church (1969–72), then at the Claremont U.M. Church in Claremont, California.

Swenson was ordained to the ministry of the Pacific Northwest annual conference of the United Methodist Church by Bishop Wilbur Choy (deacon in 1973 and elder in 1976). Her pastoral appointments included associate pastor, Claremont U.M.C. (1973–74); pastor, Orchards U.M.C., Vancouver, Washington (1974–83); and senior pastor of First U.M.C., Wenatchee, Washington (1989–92). Swenson was also appointed superintendent of the Puget Sound district of the Pacific Northwest Conference (1983–89).

As district superintendent, Swenson also served as the dean of the bishop's cabinet (1988–89). While appointed to Wenatchee, she also served as president of both the board of directors of the Rape Crisis and Domestic Violence Center and the board of directors of the North Central Washington AIDS Coalition (1989–92).

Denominational service
For the greater U.M. Church, Swenson served as a director of the U.M. General Board of Discipleship (1976–84) and of the Division of Lay Life and Work (1984–92). She also served on the board of directors of the U.M. General Board of Global Ministries, as well as on its Mission Personnel Committee and the National Town and Country Network. She was elected by the Pacific Northwest Conference as a delegate to U.M. General and Jurisdictional Conferences (1980–92).

Episcopal ministry
Swenson was elected to the episcopacy of the United Methodist Church by the 1992 Western Jurisdictional Conference. She was assigned the Denver episcopal area, where she served until 2000. She was then assigned the Los Angeles Area, including the California-Pacific Annual Conference and the Korean Mission of the Western Jurisdictional Conference. In 2004 she Swenson was reassigned to the Los Angeles Area and in 2008, that assignment was extended to 2012.

Swenson chaired the committee to Eliminate Institutional Racism and the committee on personnel and nominations of the National Division of the U.M. General Board of Global Ministries (1992–2000).  She also returned to the General Board of Discipleship, chairing a long range planning strategy committee and serving as President (1996–2000). In 2000 she became a member of the General Council on Finance and Administration(GCFA), chairing the Legislative Committee, and assigned to the Personnel Committee and the Executive Committee; Swenson also has served as the President of GCFA. She now serves as president of the church's General Commission on Christian Unity and Inter-religious Concerns (GCCUIC).

Leisure pursuits
For recreation, Swenson enjoys reading, racquetball and walking. On their 25th wedding anniversary, the Swensons received a tandem bicycle. They have become avid cyclists, completing several bike tours. In 1998 they rode across the United States from the Pacific to the Atlantic oceans, covering 4,059 miles in 58 days.

Self description
In her official biography, Bishop Swenson considers herself "an outspoken leader on issues of inclusiveness and violence."  She was one of fifteen maverick U.M. Bishops who signed a statement in 1996 protesting the denomination's official stance on homosexuality.  In 1999 she was featured in the PBS series "Religion & Ethics Newsweekly." Bishop Swenson describes her foundational values as diversity, team/partnership, and justice.  She continues to pursue her dream of leading the church in becoming a more inclusive community, justice seeking, and more perfect in love of God and neighbor.

Honors
Bishop Swenson was awarded the degree Doctor of Divinity by her alma mater, Millsaps College, in 1994.  That same year she was named a Distinguished Alumna by the Claremont School of Theology.  She is an Honorary Alumna of the Iliff School of Theology, Denver, Colorado.  She has served on the Boards of Trustees for both Iliff, and the Saint Paul School of Theology, Kansas City, Missouri.

See also
 List of bishops of the United Methodist Church

References
 Mary Ann Swenson (official biography) 
 Mary Ann Swenson (biography from the Council of Bishops)
 InfoServ, the official information service of The United Methodist Church.  
 The Council of Bishops of the United Methodist Church 

1947 births
Living people
American United Methodist bishops
Women Methodist bishops
People from Pasadena, California
Female touring cyclists
People from Vancouver, Washington